The following is a list of Grammy Awards winners and nominees from Italy:

Notes

References

Italian
 Grammy
Grammy
Grammy